The major skink (Bellatorias frerei) is a species of skink, a lizard in the family Scincidae. 

The species is found in New Guinea and Australia in the states of Queensland and New South Wales.

References

Skinks of Australia
Skinks of New Guinea
Taxa named by Albert Günther
Reptiles described in 1897
Bellatorias